Herbert Bednorz (25 September 1908 in Gliwice – 12 April 1989 in Katowice) was a Polish Catholic priest, theologist, and a Coadjutor bishop (from 1950) and later, from 1967, bishop of Roman Catholic Diocese of Katowice.

1908 births
1989 deaths
People from Gliwice
People from the Province of Silesia
20th-century Roman Catholic bishops in Poland